SC Magdeburg is a handball club from Magdeburg, Germany, and is competing in the Handball-Bundesliga.

History
During the time in the GDR, the club won 10 national championships (1970, 1977, 1980, 1981, 1982, 1983, 1984, 1985, 1988, 1991) and won the GDR Cup four times. In 1991, SC Magdeburg won the last GDR championship before being promoted to the Handball-Bundesliga. The team won the Handball-Bundesliga twice (2001, 2022), the DHB-Pokal twice (1996, 2016) and the DHB-Supercup twice (1996, 2001). His international achievements: he won the EHF Champions League 3 times (1978, 1981, 2002), the EHF European League four times (1999, 2001, 2007, 2021), the EHF Super Cup three times (1981, 2001, 2002) and the IHF Super Globe twice (2021, 2022).

Crest, colours, supporters

Naming history

Kit manufacturers

Kits

Sports Hall information

Name: – GETEC Arena
City: – Magdeburg
Capacity: – 6600
Address: – Berliner Chaussee 32, 39114 Magdeburg, Germany

Team

Current squad
Squad for the 2022–23 season

Goalkeepers	
1  Mike Jensen
 80  Nikola Portner
Left Wingers
6  Matthias Musche
 22  Lukas Mertens
Right Wingers
 11  Daniel Pettersson
 17  Tim Hornke
Line Players
2  Lucas Meister
 23  Magnus Saugstrup 
 54  Oscar Bergendahl

Left Backs
3  Piotr Chrapkowski
 20  Philipp Weber
 34  Michael Damgaard
Centre Backs
 10  Gísli Þorgeir Kristjánsson 
 24  Christian O'Sullivan 
 25  Marko Bezjak
Right Backs
5  Vladan Lipovina
 14  Ómar Ingi Magnússon 
 31  Kay Smits

Technical staff
 Head Coach:  Bennet Wiegert
 Assistant Coach:  Yves Grafenhorst
 Athletic Trainer:  Daniel Müller

Transfers
Transfers for the 2023–24 season

Joining 
  Felix Claar (CB) (from  Aalborg Håndbold)
  Albin Lagergren (RB) (from  Rhein-Neckar Löwen)

 Leaving
  Piotr Chrapkowski (LB) (to ?)
  Marko Bezjak (CB) (to  RK Nexe Našice) 
  Kay Smits (RB) (to  SG Flensburg-Handewitt)
  Vladan Lipovina (RB) (to ?)

Previous squads

Retired numbers

Accomplishments

Domestic
Handball-Bundesliga:
 : 2001, 2022
DHB-Pokal:
 : 1996, 2016
 : 2002, 2015, 2019, 2022
DHB-Supercup:
 : 1996, 2001
 : 2022
Oberliga: 10
 : 1970, 1977, 1980, 1981, 1982, 1983, 1984, 1985, 1988, 1991
 : 1971, 1974, 1975, 1976, 1978, 1979, 1986, 1989
FDGB-Pokal:
 : 1977, 1978, 1984, 1990

International
EHF Champions League:
 : 1978, 1981, 2002
EHF Cup Winners' Cup:
 : 1977, 1979
EHF Cup / EHF European League:
 : 1999, 2001, 2007, 2021
 : 2005, 2022
EHF Super Cup:
 : 1981, 2001, 2002
 : 1999, 2005
IHF Super Globe:
 : 2021, 2022
 : 2002

European record

European Cup and Champions League

EHF Cup and EHF European League

EHF ranking

Former club members

Notable former players

  Johannes Bitter (2003–2007)
  Fabian Böhm (2006–2010)
  Henning Fritz (1988–2001)
  Erik Göthel (1994–2001, 2006–2007)
  Yves Grafenhorst (1997–2017)
  Michael Haaß (2013–2016)
  Silvio Heinevetter (2005–2009)
  Tim Hornke (2010–2014, 2019–)
  Maximilian Janke (2008–2015)
  Stephan Just (2003–2005)
  Stefan Kneer (2012–2014)
  Thomas Knorr (2013–2014)
  Stefan Kretzschmar (1996–2007)
  Jens Kürbis (1991–1995)
  Sven Lakenmacher (1987–1990)
  Wolfgang Lakenmacher (1967–1977)
  Finn Lemke (2015–2017)
  Maik Machulla (1991–2001)
  Lukas Mertens (2017–)
  Matthias Musche (2011–)
  Jürgen Müller (2008–2010)
  Moritz Preuss (2019–)
  Peter Pysall (1974–1990, 1992–1993)
  Dario Quenstedt (2000–2011)
  Tobias Reichmann (2008–2009)
  Markus Richwien (2005–2006)
  Oliver Roggisch (2005–2007)
  Jürgen Rohde (1967–1973)
  Andreas Rojewski (2001–2016)
  Moritz Schäpsmeier (2012–2013)
  Gunar Schimrock (1977–1997)
  Erik Schmidt (2019–2020)
  Christian Schöne (1996–2005)
  Jens Schöngarth (2016)
  Christian Sprenger (1998–2009)
  Christoph Steinert (2007–2010, 2019–2021)
  Steffen Stiebler (1989–2009)
  Christoph Theuerkauf (2003–2010)
  Philipp Weber (2003–2013, 2021–)
  Bennet Wiegert (1989–2004, 2007–2013)
  Martin Ziemer (2000–2004)
  Robert Weber (2009–2019)
  Damir Doborac (2010–2012)
  Marco Oneto (2013–2014)
  Željko Musa (2015–2021)
  Sune Agerschou (2001–2002)
  Kristian Asmussen (2012–2013)
  Jacob Bagersted (2014–2017)
  Mads Christiansen (2016–2019)
  Michael Damgaard (2015–)
  Jannick Green (2014–2022)
  Mike Jensen (2021–)
  Damien Kabengele (2007–2010)
  Joël Abati (1997–2007)
  Christian Gaudin (1999–2003)
  Guéric Kervadec (1997–2002)
  Alexandros Vasilakis (2007–2009)
  Zsolt Balogh (2010–2011)
  Arnór Atlason (2004–2006)
  Björgvin Páll Gústavsson (2011–2013)
  Einar Hólmgeirsson (2012)
  Gísli Þorgeir Kristjánsson (2020–)
  Ómar Ingi Magnússon (2020–)
  Sigfús Sigurðsson (2002–2006)
  Ólafur Stefánsson (1998–2003)
  Almantas Savonis (1998–1999)
  Valdas Novickis (2006–2007)
  Vigindas Petkevičius (1991–1999)
  Gerrie Eijlers (2009–2014)
  Kay Smits (2020, 2021–)
  Fabian van Olphen (2006–2017)
  Magnus Gullerud (2020–2022)
  Espen Lie Hansen (2014–2015)
  Nicolay Hauge (2008–2011)
  Ole Erevik (2007–2008)
  Christian O'Sullivan (2016–)
  Stian Tønnesen (2007–2013)
  Karol Bielecki (2004–2007)
  Piotr Chrapkowski (2017–)
  Maciej Dmytruszyński (2005–2006)
  Maciej Gębala (2013–2016)
  Tomasz Gębala (2013–2016)
  Bartosz Jurecki (2006–2015)
  Tomasz Lebiedzinski (1995–1999)
  Grzegorz Tkaczyk (2002–2007)
  Rareș Jurcă (2002–2003)
  Robert Licu (1993–1998, 2003–2004)
  Vyacheslav Atavin (1997–2000)
  Gleb Kalarash (2017–2018)
  Vassili Koudinov (2000–2001)
  Oleg Kuleshov (1999–2007)
  Stanislav Kulinchenko (2001)
  Yuri Nesterov (2005)
  Marko Bezjak (2013–)
  Jure Natek (2010–2016)
  Aleš Pajovič (2011–2013)
  Renato Vugrinec (2004–2006)
  Carlos Molina (2017–2019)
  Ignacio Plaza Jiménez (2018–2019)
  Nenad Peruničić (2001–2004)
  Nemanja Zelenović (2015–2018)
  Nikola Portner (2022–)
  Lucas Meister (2022–)
  Albin Lagergren (2018–2020)
  Daniel Pettersson (2016–)
  Tobias Thulin (2018–2021)

Former coaches

References

External links
 Official website

Sport in Magdeburg
German handball clubs
Handball-Bundesliga
Athletics clubs in Germany
1955 establishments in East Germany
Sports clubs in East Germany
Handball clubs established in 1955